Santa Rosalía is a small town in Etzatlán municipality, Jalisco state, Mexico.

Populated places in Jalisco